Gibles is a commune in the Saône-et-Loire department in the region of Bourgogne-Franche-Comté in eastern France.

Administration

Mayors of Gibles have included:

1955-1977 Louis Gatille
1977-1995 Jean Grisard
1995-2014 Jean-Claude Renon
2014-incumbent Bernard Grisard

Geography

Gibles is part of the Brionnais countryside. It is situated:
 10 minutes from La Clayette
 20 minutes from Charolles
 30 minutes from Paray-Le-Monial 
 40 minutes from Roanne
 45 minutes from Mâcon

Demography

Places of interest

See also
Communes of the Saône-et-Loire department

References

Communes of Saône-et-Loire